Wangyi District is a district of the city of Tongchuan in the Shaanxi province of the People's Republic of China.

Administrative divisions
As 2020, Wangyi District administers six subdistricts and one town.
Subdistricts

-Subdistricts are upgraded from Towns.

Towns
 Huangbao
- Former Townships are merged to others.
 Wangyi Township, Wangjiahe Township

References

External links
Introduction to Wangyi District (Chinese)

Districts of Shaanxi
Tongchuan